Szymbark is a village in the administrative district of Gmina Iława, within Iława County, Warmian-Masurian Voivodeship, in northern Poland. The village has a population of 395. It is located on the northern shore of Szymbarskie Lake.

The castle 
The construction of the castle began in 1301. It was built by the Teutonic Order as a summer residence of the Bishop of Pomesania. A Latin inscription above the main gate (Hec Porta Constructa Est Anno Domini MCCCLXXXVI Tempore Fratris Henrici De Skarlin Prepoziti) dates back to 1386 and mentions brother Henry of Skarlin as constructor. Sometimes he is described as the founder of the castle. The castle became property of the last Catholic and first Lutheran Bishop of Pomesania, Georg von Polentz, after the secularization of the Order. In 1699 it was bought by Ernst Graf Finck von Finckenstein and remained property of the Finckenstein family until 
  
In April 1945, about three month after the conquest by the Soviet Union, and again in 1947 the castle was set on fire and completely destroyed. The ruins were used for the 1996 movie The Ogre by Volker Schlöndorff with John Malkovich in the title role.

Sports
The local football club is LZS Zamek Szymbark. It competes in the lower leagues.

Notable residents
Katharina Dorothea Finck von Finckenstein

Notes and references

External links
 Szymbark and John Malkovich 
 Szlakiem starych cmentarzy na Mazurach Zachodnich 
 pre-war pictures 
 19th century view 

Populated lakeshore places in Poland
Szymbark